Ian Rawlings (born 9 March 1959) is an Australian actor. He is best known for his long-running roles in soap operas Sons and Daughters and Neighbours. He also appeared in the short-lived serial The Power, the Passion.

Career

Sons and Daughters
Rawlings started out playing the role of the scheming Wayne Hamilton/Morrell in Sons and Daughters. An original cast member of the show, he continued in the role for the show's entire 1982–1987 run.

Neighbours
He subsequently played the role of Philip Martin in Neighbours from 1992 to 1999 (and briefly reprised this role in episodes commemorating the programme's 20th anniversary in 2005) as well as a cameo appearance in the very last episode of Neighbours in 2022. The character had appeared briefly some years before portrayed by Christopher Milne. Before this role, Rawlings had a guest appearance on the show as Marcus Stone.

Filmography (selected)

References

External links
 
Ian Rawlings as Philip Martin

1959 births
Australian male soap opera actors
Living people
Logie Award winners
People from Whyalla